Lee Murray may refer to: 

 Lee Murray New Zealand writer and editor
 Lee Murray (1977), English mixed martial arts fighter and criminal